Neon Giant AB is a Swedish video game developer headquartered in Uppsala, Sweden. It was founded by Tor Frick, Arcade Berg, Jonathan Heckley and Erik Gloersen in 2018.

History 
Neon Giant was founded in April 2018 as an independent venture by former AAA employee game developers; Tor Frick, Arcade Berg, Jonathan Heckley and Erik Gloersen. With the support of investor company Goodbye Kansas (now known as Amplifier Game Invest), Neon Giant received an initial investment of 1,000,000 kr (approximately $110,000). Upon investing in the company, Amplifier Game Invest CEO, Per-Arne Luundberg said — "Neon Giant consists of a real dream team that not only has enormous experience, they also have an incredibly efficient working process —I'm convinced that their first release will be a milestone in Swedish game development". The founders had previously worked on popular games such as Bulletstorm, Far Cry 3, Gears of War, Wolfenstein and Doom.

On June 28, 2018, Neon Giant were recipients of one of 37 developers grants offered by Epic Games to promising developers working with Unreal Engine 4. They were awarded between $5000 and $50,000 based on their work on an unannounced title "set in a brand new cyberpunk world".

In May 2020, Neon Giant announced their debut game, The Ascent. It is a cyberpunk themed action-roleplaying game which was released on 29 July 2021. The Neon Giant team consists of 11 people. 

On November 11, 2022, South Korean video game publisher Krafton announced that it planned to acquire Neon Giant.

On December 14, 2022, they were being acquired by Krafton for un undisclosed sum.

Games developed

References

External links 
 

Swedish companies established in 2018
Video game companies established in 2018
Video game companies of Sweden
Video game development companies
Uppsala
Companies based in Uppsala County
2022 mergers and acquisitions